The McAllen Palms were a minor league baseball team based in McAllen, Texas. In 1931, the Palms played as members of the Class D level Rio Grande Valley League, winning the league championship in a shortened season.

History
The Palms were preceded in minor league play by the 1928 "McAllen" team, which played the season as members of the Class D level Texas Valley League.

The McAllen "Palms" began play in 1931. The four–team, Class D level Rio Grande Valley League began the season with the Corpus Christi Seahawks, Harlingen Ladds,and San Benito Saints joining McAllen in beginning league play on April 22, 1931. On June 4, 1931, Corpus Christi moved to become the La Feria Nighthawks.

The "Palms" nickname corresponds to local agriculture in the era. Palm trees became prevalent in the area and were harvested. McAllen is nicknamed as "The City of Palms."

During its first season of league play, the Rio Grande Valley League folded on July 30, 1931 with the Palms in 1st place. Despite folding, the league held finals that featured McAllen vs. La Feria. The Palms were in 1st place overall when the league folded, finishing the 1931 overall regular season with a record of 55–37, playing under manager Tex Covington. McAllen won the 1st half pennant and finished 7.5 games ahead of the Seahawks/Nighthawks in the final overall standings. The Palms played La Feria in a playoff, after the Nighthawks won the second–half title in the split–schedule season. In the 1931 finals, the McAllen Palms swept La Feria in three games.

Harry Bonds of McAllen led the Rio Grande Valley League with eight home runs, while teammate Frank Denson led the league with 70 stolen bases, 109 total hits and 99 runs scored. Palms pitcher Horace Hardy led the league with an 11–3 record.

Following the 1931 season, the Rio Grande Valley League did not return to play in 1932. McAllen next hosted the 1938 McAllen Packers, who played as members of the Class D level Texas Valley League, which reformed after a nine–season hiatus.

The ballpark
The name of the home ballpark for 1931 McAllen Palms minor league games is unknown.

Year–by–year record

Notable alumni
Tex Covington (1931, MGR)
The complete player roster for the 1931 McAllen Palms is unknown.

References

External links
Baseball Reference

Defunct minor league baseball teams
Professional baseball teams in Texas
Defunct baseball teams in Texas
Baseball teams established in 1931
Baseball teams disestablished in 1931
1931 establishments in Texas
1931 disestablishments in Texas
Defunct Rio Grande Valley League teams
Sports in the Rio Grande Valley
McAllen, Texas